The Navy Superior Civilian Service Award is the highest honorary award the Chief of Naval Operations or the Commandant of the Marine Corps may bestow on a civilian employee in the Department of the Navy and the highest award granted at the major claimant level.  This is the second highest honorary award under the Department of the Navy Civilian Awards program.

This award recognizes employee contributions that are exceptionally high in value, but affect a smaller area than the Navy Distinguished Civilian Service Award and are more significant than those for which the award of the Navy Meritorious Civilian Service Award is made.  The Superior Civilian Service Award may be awarded for contributions that serve as a model for other commands. The award consists of a certificate, citation, medal, and lapel bar.

The award is presented for:

 Indications of innovative leadership of highly successful programs or projects that had impact beyond the employee’s command.
 Accomplishments/achievements that have had as a minimum, a wide impact in the Department of the Navy.
 Scientific or technical advances, or suggestions of significant value.
 Accomplishments that show unusual management abilities, innovative thinking, and/or outstanding leadership, which benefit the Department of the Navy.
 Responsibility for major cost savings/reductions/avoidance.
 Unusual acts of heroism.
 Exceptional cooperative efforts with other Navy offices, Naval civilian employees, Federal agencies, or the private sector.

Notable award recipients
 Timothy P. Trant, Chief of Naval Personnel, 1996
 Timothy P. Trant, Chief of Naval Personnel, 2002 (2nd Award)
Judith Harrison, 2014
Lisa M. Schenck, 2020

Sources

External links
 US Marine Corps Systems Command website 

Awards and decorations of the United States Department of Defense
Awards and decorations of the United States Navy